Dossiers is a various artists compilation album released in 1992 by Dossier.

Track listing

Personnel
Adapted from the Dossiers liner notes.

 Walter Herbert – cover art
 Manfred Schiek – production

Release history

References

External links 
 Dossiers at Discogs (list of releases)

1992 compilation albums